Ganado Independent School District is a public school district based in Ganado, Texas (USA).

In 2009, the school district was rated "academically acceptable" by the Texas Education Agency.

Campuses
Ganado High School (9-12)
Ganado Jr High School (6-8)
Ganado Elementary School (PK-5)

Athletics
Men's Sports: Football, Cross Country, Powerlifting, Baseball, Golf, Basketball, Track
Women's Sports: Cross Country, Golf, Volleyball, Track, Softball, Cheerleading, Powerlifting

Mascot
The main mascot for the schools is the Indians, while the women sports teams are represented as the Maidens.

References

External links
 

School districts in Jackson County, Texas
Public schools